Faught is a surname. Notable people with the name include:

 Bob Faught (1921–2002), American basketball player
 George Faught (born 1962), American businessman and politician
 Howard E. Faught (1907–1955), American politician and jurist
 Josh Faught (born 1979), American artist